Humsafar is the second album of playback singer "KK" (Krishnakumar Kunnath), released in January 2008.  The music was composed by KK himself and lyrics were by Mehboob in Hindi, and KK in English.

Overview

Humsafar, came eight years after the release of KK's super-hit debut album Pal. It belongs to the pop-rock genre and has a total of 10 songs.

Humsafar has two songs - "Din Ho Ya Raat" and "Mehki Hawa" - from Pal, KK's earlier album. The album has a fun-filled romantic number - "Aasman Ke", featuring the singer and a south Indian model, Suhasi Goradia Dhami, in the video. "Humsafar", the title track, an interplay of English and Hindi lyrics, is about one's conscience and how it is a constant companion in the journey of life.

One of the songs, "Yeh Kahan", was penned seven years before the release and "Dekho Na", a rock number, was written six years ago. The rest of the six songs came about in the last two years before the release. Other songs in the album include "Rain Bhai Kaari", a mix of Bengali Baul with rock and a tinge of S D Burman, and "Cineraria", a fun-filled English ballad. KK's 13-year-old  son, Nakul, also sang a song "Masti" in the album with his father.

Track listing

References

2008 soundtrack albums
KK (singer) albums